Pazik (also Romanized as Pazīk; also known as Pazī and Pezī) is a village in Chaybasar-e Sharqi Rural District, in the Central District of Poldasht County, West Azerbaijan Province, Iran. At the 2006 census, its population was 522, in 95 families.

References 

Populated places in Poldasht County